Henry Thomas Barling (1 September 1906 at Kensington, London – 2 January 1993 at Hastings, Sussex) was an English cricketer. A right-handed batsman, in a first-class career with Surrey lasting from 1927 to 1948, he scored 19209 runs at an average of 34.61, with 34 hundreds and a highest score of 269.

During World War II, he served in Coastal Command of the RAF.  After retiring from first-class cricket, he was a coach at Harrow School from 1948 to 1966.

External links 
 Cricinfo profile
 Wisden obituary

1906 births
1993 deaths
English cricketers
Surrey cricketers
English cricket coaches
Royal Air Force personnel of World War II
East of England cricketers